The Journal of Cinema and Media Studies (formerly Cinema Journal and The Journal of the Society of Cinematologists) is the official academic journal of the Society for Cinema and Media Studies (formerly the Society for Cinema Studies). It covers film studies, television studies, media studies, visual arts, cultural studies, film and media history, and moving image studies and is published by the University of Michigan Press.

History
The journal began publishing in 1961 as The Journal of the Society of Cinematologists—publishing research from the organization that would become SCS and then SCMS. In 1966, it evolved into Cinema Journal. It remained so named until October 2018 when it became The Journal of Cinema and Media Studies to better align itself with the name of its host organization.

See also
 List of film periodicals

References

Film studies journals
Television studies journals
Publications established in 1967
University of Texas Press academic journals
Quarterly journals
English-language journals
Magazines published in Austin, Texas